This is a detailed list of human spaceflights from 1991 to 2000, including the continuation of Russian space station Mir and the American Space Shuttle program, and the first flights to the International Space Station (ISS).

The Soviet Union broke up at the end of 1991. From this date onwards the former USSR constituent republics are shown as separate nationalities.

See also

List of human spaceflight programs
List of human spaceflights
List of human spaceflights, 1961–1970
List of human spaceflights, 1971–1980
List of human spaceflights, 1981–1990
List of human spaceflights, 2001–2010
List of human spaceflights, 2011–2020
List of human spaceflights, 2021–present

References
Vostok and Voskhod flight history
Mercury flight history
X-15 flight history (altitudes given in feet)
Gemini flight history
Apollo flight history (student resource)
Skylab flight history
Apollo-Soyuz flight history
Space Shuttle flight history infographic
Shenzhou flight history timeline
SpaceShipOne flight history

1991
1990
Spaceflight timelines
1990s-related lists